Pardon My Scotch is a 1935 short subject directed by Del Lord starring American slapstick comedy team The Three Stooges (Moe Howard, Larry Fine and Curly Howard). It is the ninth entry in the series released by Columbia Pictures starring the comedians, who appeared in 190 shorts at the studio between 1934 and 1959.

Plot
The Stooges, working as carpenters for at least ten years, are temporarily left in charge of a drugstore while the store's owner, Jones heads down to the liquor supplier to confront them. When a liquor supplier (Nat Carr) stops by and asks for a drink, the Stooges mix a drink using all manner of medicines and chemicals, and mixed with a rubber boot. The concoction reacts, and it is so strong that it cuts through a wicker chair serving as an improvised sieve. But the salesman loves the libation (which he thought was Scotch), and he convinces the Stooges to pose as Scotsmen and attend a party at his boss' house, where he can sign the Stooges to a liquor contract for their invention, dubbed the "Breath of Heather".

After a raucous Highland Fling dance and a dinner (which Moe destroys by slapping Curly over the table), the barrel of the lethal "scotch" is presented. The Stooges' attempt to tap the barrel results in an explosion which engulfs all the party guests in a sea of foam.

Cast

Credited
 Moe Howard as Moe
 Larry Fine as Larry
 Curly Howard as Curly
 Nat Carr as Mr. Martin
 James C. Morton as J. T. Walton

Uncredited
 Al Thompson as Mr. Jones
 Gladys Gale as Mrs. Walton
 Billy Gilbert as Signor Louis Balero Cantino
 Barlowe Borland as Scotsman from Loch Lomond 
 Symona Boniface as Larry's dinner companion
 Alec Craig as Short bagpiper
 Scotty Dunsmuir as Tall bagpiper

Production notes
Pardon My Scotch was filmed on April 11–15, 1935, sixteen months after the ratification of the Twenty-first Amendment, which ended the American experiment with Prohibition. This event is an integral part of the storyline, with the drugstore owner (Al Thompson) frantically attempting to lay in a stock of liquor in anticipation of the imminent end of Prohibition.

The title Pardon My Scotch parodies the expression "Pardon my French." The term "Scotch" for "Scottish" is now considered impolite, although "Scotch" as a type of whiskey is still acceptable.

Pardon My Scotch is the first Stooge film to employ "Listen to the Mocking Bird" as the Stooges' official theme song, as arranged by Louis Silvers. It would be used up to and including 1939's Three Little Sew and Sews.

The gag of tossing fruit into a singer's open mouth was reused in the 1945 film Micro-Phonies.

When the liquor supplier prepares to consume the Stooges' volatile concoction, they wish him well in a triad pattern saying "Over the river," "Skip the gutter," and concluding with "Ver gerharget," a Yiddish expression meaning "get killed" or "drop dead."

The scene where the Stooges perform while the bagpipes played was featured in the 2003 comedy film, Daddy Day Care.

Moe's injury
During the opening scene where the boys are assembling a door, Moe asks Curly to saw a piece of wood for him. Curly lays the wood on top of a wooden table, which Moe happens to be standing on. Curly then proceeds to buzzsaw both the wood and table in half, with the table splitting in two. However, the table split inward on Moe's half of it, and Moe came crashing down on his left side, breaking three ribs. He was able to pull himself up and deliver a double slap to Larry and Curly before collapsing. Moe was then rushed to the hospital while production ceased briefly. In his 1977 autobiography Moe Howard and the Three Stooges (later published as I Stooged to Conquer), Moe incorrectly identified the film in which this injury occurred as Beer and Pretzels.

To avoid additional injuries, the painful footage was reused in 1943 at the start of Dizzy Detectives.

References

External links 
 
 
Pardon My Scotch at threestooges.net

1935 films
1935 comedy films
The Three Stooges films
American black-and-white films
Films directed by Del Lord
Columbia Pictures short films
American slapstick comedy films
1930s English-language films
1930s American films